The 2022–23 season is HNK Gorica 14th season in existence and the club's fifth consecutive season in the top flight of Croatian football. In addition to the domestic league, Gorica are participating in this season's edition of the Croatian Cup. The season covers the period from 1 July 2022 to 30 June 2023.

Current squad

Transfers

In

Source: Glasilo Hrvatskog nogometnog saveza

Out

Source: Glasilo Hrvatskog nogometnog saveza

Total spending:  1,000,000 €

Total income:  4,330,000 €

Total expenditure:  3,330,000 €

Competitions

Overview

SuperSport HNL

League table

Results summary

Results by round

Matches

Croatian Football Cup

Player seasonal records
Updated 18 March 2023

Goals

Source: Competitive matches

Clean sheets

Source: Competitive matches

Disciplinary record

Appearances and goals

Notes

References

External links

HNK Gorica seasons
Gorica